Mohammad Esmail Shooshtari (born 1949 in Quchan, Razavi Khorasan province) is a former Iranian politician who was the Minister of Justice of the Islamic Republic of Iran from 1989 to 2005.

He is a former member of the Islamic Consultative Assembly.

He was a member of a committee that investigated the death of Zahra Kazemi.

See also
Jamal Karimi-Rad

References and notes

1949 births
Living people
Politicians from Nishapur
Members of the 1st Islamic Consultative Assembly
Members of the 2nd Islamic Consultative Assembly
Executives of Construction Party politicians
Iranian wardens
Ministers of Justice of Iran